Price Glacier is a glacier 3.5 miles (6 km) long, flowing southwest to Cheapman Bay on the south side of South Georgia. It was surveyed by the South Georgia Survey in the period 1951–57, and named for a member of the survey, Thomas Price, in 1955-56

See also
 List of glaciers in the Antarctic
 Glaciology

References

Glaciers of South Georgia